Dollhouse is an American science fiction television series created by Joss Whedon which premiered on Fox on February 13, 2009 in the United States. It ran for two seasons before its cancellation, ending its run January 29, 2010. The series comprises 27 produced episodes, with two unaired episodes – the original unaired pilot episode, "Echo" and the season one coda, "Epitaph One", which was aired internationally. Both episodes were made available on the season one DVD and Blu-ray releases.

The series focuses around Echo (Eliza Dushku), a member of a group of people known as "dolls". The dolls have had their personalities wiped clean so that they can be imprinted with any number of new personas, becoming "actives". Actives are given skills including memory, muscle memory, and language for different assignments, which are called "engagements". They are then hired out for particular jobs, crimes, fantasies, and occasional good deeds by the extremely wealthy. On missions, Actives are monitored internally (and remotely) by Handlers. In between tasks, they are mind-wiped into a childlike state referred to as the Tabula rasa (blank slate), and live in a futuristic dormitory/laboratory set up as a spa, complete with five-star cuisine, exercise equipment, pools, games, relaxation techniques and tai chi classes, and professional massages. The hidden facility is called the Dollhouse, run by Adelle DeWitt (Olivia Williams) and located in Los Angeles as part of an international network of similar facilities. The story follows Echo, who begins, in her mind-wiped state, to become self-aware.

During its two-season run, Dollhouse explores the issues of the morality and philosophy behind its technology, as well as showcasing the disastrous consequences of what could happen if the ability to wipe away a person's entire being could be put in the wrong hands. Switching between action/adventure, comedy, science fiction, drama, and conspiracy thriller, Dollhouse showcased Echo's ability to move into personhood within the tabula rasa state. During the first season the Dollhouse faces the insane rogue Active Alpha, and during the second season Echo faces down the Rossum Corporation—the force behind the Dollhouse.

Dollhouse also features an ensemble cast of the people in the Los Angeles Dollhouse, including Paul Ballard (Tahmoh Penikett), a discredited FBI agent who falls in love with Echo and finds himself entangled in the Dollhouse conspiracy in his attempts to free her, Victor  (Enver Gjokaj) and Sierra  (Dichen Lachman), two dolls who also "wake up" within their wiped state and fall in love with each other, and the people behind the Dollhouse—Adelle DeWitt  (Olivia Williams); Topher Brink (Fran Kranz), the genius programmer behind the Dollhouse; Dr. Claire Saunders (Amy Acker), the scarred and haunted doctor of the Dollhouse who has secrets of her own; and Boyd Langton (Harry Lennix), Echo's handler and an ex-cop who struggles with the morality of the Dollhouse.

Series overview

Episodes
In this table, the number in the first column refers to the episode's number within the overall series, whereas the number in the second column indicates the episode's number within that particular season. "U.S. viewers (millions)" refers to the number of Americans who watched the episode upon its original broadcast.

Season 1 (2009)

Season 2 (2009–10)

Fox renewed Dollhouse for a 13-episode second and final season that began broadcasting on September 25, 2009. Citing persistently low ratings, Fox officially canceled Dollhouse on November 11, 2009 during production of the eleventh episode.

References

External links
 

Lists of American science fiction television series episodes